The name Strange Harvest may refer to: the novel by Kyle Onstott and Ashley Carter.

Strange Harvest is a collection of stories by American writer Donald Wandrei. It was released in 1965 and was the author's fourth book published by Arkham House. It was released in an edition of 2,000 copies.  Many of the stories originally appeared in the magazines Weird Tales and Astounding Stories.

Contents
Strange Harvest contains the following tales:

 "Spawn of the Sea"
 "Something from Above"
 "The Green Flame"
 "Strange Harvest"
 "The Chuckler"
 "The Whisperers"
 "The Destroying Horde"
 "Uneasy Lie the Drowned"
 "Life Current"
 "The Fire Vampires"
 "An Atom-Smasher"
 "Murray's light"
 "The Men Who Never Lived"
 "Infinity Zero"
 "A Trip to Infinity"
 "Giant-Plasm"
 "Nightmare"

Sources

1965 short story collections
Fantasy short story collections
Horror short story collections
Science fiction short story collections by Donald Wandrei